Rubus coreanus, known as bokbunja, Korean blackberry, or Korean bramble, is a species of raspberry native to Korea, Japan, and China. It produces edible berries (not true berries in the botanical sense) that can be fermented into bokbunja ju, a Korean fruit wine (although the majority of fruit commercially grown for producing this drink are actually Rubus occidentalis, native to North America). R. coreanus fruits are usually harvested between the May and July at peak harvest season. They can only be cultivated in a few areas in Korea, different to Rubus occidentalis, which can be cultivated widely across the country.

Species variations 
Rubus coreanus belongs to an extensive family of various fruit species with similar qualities. The genus Rubus (family Rosacea) comprises 600 to 800 species distributed in temperate climate and polar regions of the world. Fruits of Rubus species, commonly known as raspberries in Europe and the United States of America are largely distinguished by their color (red, black, and purple). Approximately 20 Rubus species are naturally found in Korea, including Rubus parvifolius, Rubus crataegifolius, Rubus corchorifolius, Rubus oldhamii, and Rubus coreanus.

Folk medicine use and health claims 
Rubus coreanus has been used as traditional alternative medicine, as well as regular food, depending on its ripeness. Various studies are claimed to have demonstrated that fruits of R. coreanus might reduce the risk of diseases, including asthma, allergies, and obesity (unripe fruits) and might be effective in reducing inflammation. They are said to exhibit antioxidative, antipyretic, anticancer, and anti-high cholesterol properties, similar to many other fruits and vegetables.

Advertised compounds and industrial methods of making plant extracts 
R. coreanus is rich in antioxidant compounds. A major active compound in R. coreanus, like in every other raspberry and several other fruits and nuts, is ellagic acid, which in the marketing of Korean raspberry products is especially claimed to possess anti-obesity and antioxidant properties. 

Ellagic acid has been marketed as a dietary supplement with various claimed benefits against cancer, heart disease, and other diseases. In the 21st century, numerous U.S.-based supplement companies received FDA warning letters for promoting ellagic acid with false anti-disease claims that violate the Federal Food, Drug, and Cosmetic Act. Ellagic acid has been identified by the FDA as a "fake cancer 'cure'". There is no scientific evidence to support the claims that ellagic acid can treat or prevent cancer. 

Fruit and leave extracts from R. coreanus for products capitalizing on health claims are made by several methods; the most employed being conventional reflux heating or sonication extraction. Both methods share the same pre-preparation stage for samples before extraction. All samples are washed, dried in shade, and ground to a fine powder using a mill. In the reflux method, the ground powder is extracted using a Soxhlet extractor for three hours, with the extracts being filtered and concentrated using a rotary evaporator under a vacuum. In the ultrasonic bath extraction method, samples are extracted with 70% methanol using an ultrasonic bath at 64 °C for 2 h.

See also
 Black raspberry
 List of ineffective cancer treatments

References

External links
 

coreanus
Flora of Eastern Asia
Flora of China
Berries
Korean fruit
Plants described in 1867
Taxa named by Friedrich Anton Wilhelm Miquel